Vanoyia tenuicornis, the long-horned soldier, is a European species of soldier fly.

Description
Vanoyia tenuicornis is strongly sexually dimorphic. The male has a black thorax and black abdomen, and no yellow pattern except on the notopleural suture and postalar callus. Legs mostly black. The female has an extensively yellow mesopleuron, and a yellow scutellum. Legs of the female are mainly orange. A remarkable species with long antenna; which
apparently have no terminal style.

Distribution
Belgium, Britain, Ireland, France, Italy, Spain, North Africa

References

Stratiomyidae
Diptera of Europe
Insects described in 1834
Taxa named by Pierre-Justin-Marie Macquart